Senator Granger may refer to:

Gideon Granger (1767–1822), New York State Senate
Miles T. Granger (1817–1895), Connecticut State Senate